Lara Croft: Tomb Raider – The Cradle of Life is a 2003 action adventure film directed by Jan de Bont and based on the Tomb Raider video game series. Angelina Jolie stars as the titular character Lara Croft with supporting performances from Gerard Butler, Ciarán Hinds, Chris Barrie, Noah Taylor, Til Schweiger, Djimon Hounsou and Simon Yam. An international co-production between the United States, the United Kingdom, Germany and Japan, the film is a sequel to the 2001 film Lara Croft: Tomb Raider.

Critics regarded The Cradle of Life as an improvement on its predecessor, particularly in the action sequences, and continued to praise Jolie's performance as Lara Croft. Despite this, it did not repeat its box office performance, grossing $156 million compared to the previous instalment's $275 million. It was still a financial success, and plans were made for a sequel, but these were cancelled when Jolie declined to reprise her role as Croft.

Plot
On Santorini island, Greece, a strong earthquake uncovers the Luna Temple. The temple was built by Alexander the Great to house his most prized treasures. Among these treasures is a glowing orb with a pattern resembling a code etched into it. Treasure-hunting archaeologist Lara Croft and her group find this orb but are ambushed by the Lo brothers; Chen and Xien, both of whom are crime lords and leaders of Chinese syndicate Shay Ling. The duo kill the group and take the orb but Lara escapes with a strange medallion.

MI6 approaches Lara with information about Pandora's box, an object from ancient legends that supposedly contains a deadly plague (the companion to the origin of life itself). The box, hidden in the mysterious Cradle of Life, can only be found with a magical sphere that serves as a map. The sphere is the same orb that was stolen by Chen Lo, who plans to sell it to Dr. Jonathan Reiss - a Nobel Prize winning scientist and business magnate turned misanthropic bio-weapon arms dealer.

Agreeing that the sphere must be kept away from Reiss, Lara agrees to help MI6, with the condition that they release her old flame Terry Sheridan, who is familiar with Chen Lo's criminal operation. Together, Terry and Lara infiltrate Chen Lo's lair, where he is smuggling the Terracotta Soldiers. Lara defeats him in a fight and learns that the orb is in Shanghai, China. In Shanghai she discovers Chen's brother Xien is trying to hand over the orb to Reiss, however once Xien hands the orb over, Reiss betrays Xien and executes him, but not before Lara manages to put a tracker on the crate containing the orb during the handoff.

Lara and Terry manage to find the orb in a lab housed in Hong Kong. However, Lara is captured by Reiss and his men. Reiss reveals his plans to unleash the plague, saving only those people he deems worthy. He is about to kill Lara Croft. Helpless and condemned, Lara is saved by Terry and then they take the orb before fleeing using wingsuits. The next day, Lara uses the orb and learns the location of the mysterious Cradle of Life; in Kenya, Africa near Mount Kilimanjaro. After Lara sends returns information to her friend Bryce back at Croft Manor, Reiss and his men infiltrate the mansion and capture him and Hillary. Lara travels to Kenya where she meets up with her longtime friend Kosa. They question a local tribe about the Cradle of Life, wherein the chief states that the Cradle of Life is in a crater protected by the "Shadow Guardians".

As they set out on an expedition, Reiss' men ambush them and kill the tribesmen. Outnumbered, Lara surrenders. Using her companions as hostages, Reiss forces Lara to lead him to the Cradle of Life. At the crater, they encounter the Shadow Guardians, monsters that appear in and out of wet patches on dead trees. The creatures kill most of Reiss' men, but Lara manages to find the "keyhole" and drops the Orb in it. The creatures disintegrate and the entrance to the Cradle of Life opens.

Lara and Reiss are drawn into the Cradle, a labyrinth made of a strange crystalline substance where normal laws of physics do not apply. Inside, they find a pool of highly corrosive black acid (linking back to one of the myths about Pandora's box), in which the box floats. Terry arrives, frees the hostages and catches up to Lara.

Lara fights Reiss but Reiss succeeds in retrieving his gun. He is about to shoot her, throw her into the acid and take Pandora's Box, but unfortunately for him Terry distracts him and saves Lara. Then Lara knocks Reiss down and throws him into the acid pool, which kills and dissolves him. Then Terry announces his intention to take the box for himself. When he refuses to back down, Lara regretfully shoots him dead, replaces the box in the pool and leaves.

Cast

 Angelina Jolie as Lara Croft
 Ciarán Hinds as Dr. Jonathan Reiss
 Gerard Butler as Terry Sheridan
 Chris Barrie as Hillary
 Noah Taylor as Bryce
 Djimon Hounsou as Kosa
 Til Schweiger as Sean
 Simon Yam as Chen Lo
 Terence Yin as Xien
 Tom Wu as Sean's Man
 Graham McTavish as Submarine Captain

Production
The budget for the film was $95 million (less than the first film's $115 million budget), and like the first film, it was financed through Tele München Gruppe. The picture was also distributed internationally by Japanese company Toho-Towa.

Filming lasted for three and a half months, which included six-day shoots on location in Hong Kong, Santorini, Llyn Gwynant in North Wales (doubling for mainland China), and a two-week stint in Kenya for shooting at Amboseli and Hell's Gate, with the remainder of the picture filmed on soundstages in the United Kingdom. One scene in the film was set in Shanghai, but it was shot on a set and not on location.

The film also featured the new 2003 Jeep Wrangler Rubicon, first seen when Lara parachutes into the moving vehicle in Africa and takes over the wheel from Kosa. As part of Jeep's advertising campaign, it was specially customised for the film by Jeep's design team along with the film's production designers, with three copies constructed for filming. 1,001 limited-run Tomb Raider models were produced—available only in silver like the film version and minus its special customisations—and put on the market to coincide with the release of the film. Jeep vice president Jeff Bell explained, "[The ad campaign] is more than just a product placement ... the Jeep Wrangler Rubicon is the most capable Jeep ever built, so the heroic and extreme environment in which Lara Croft uses her custom Wrangler Rubicon in Tomb Raider is accurate." In the end, Lara's Rubicon had less than two total minutes of screen time in the finished film.

Director Jan de Bont hated working on the movie: "It was not such a great experience. But more from the reason how the studio tried to really interfere with it in a way. And the thing itself is that the makers of the game were also involved. And they never told me that they, also, have a say in the story. Suddenly there were all these changes that have taken, and who had to be what, and what cast. And then suddenly it became such a big scene. Everything was a big deal." About working with Angelina Jolie, he said: "I kind of like working with her, and she’s a character, but I thought she was a very interesting character to work with. She’s definitely very opinionated. But not in a negative way, I feel. She was difficult to work with, but for me it was, probably, not a problem. I didn’t really see anything negative at that time. And I really ended up liking her very much, so."

Music

Soundtrack

 The track "Did My Time" by Korn was supposed to appear on the soundtrack, but due to problems with Korn's record company, this did not happen. The song still appears during the film's end credits.

Score

A score composed  and conducted by Alan Silvestri, and performed by London Symphony Orchestra, was released in 2003.

Release

Home media 
Lara Croft Tomb Raider: The Cradle of Life was released on DVD and VHS on November 18, 2003; a Blu-ray release followed on October 8, 2013. A 4K UHD Blu-ray version was released on February 27, 2018.

In the United Kingdom, the film was watched by  viewers on television in 2007, making it the year's fifth most-watched British film on television.

Reception

Box office
The film debuted in fourth place with a take of $21.8 million. In the United Kingdom, the film opened at number three, earning £1.5 million in its first three days. The film finished with a domestic gross of $65 million.

The Cradle of Life was considered more successful at the international box office, but was a domestic box office failure. It also faced competition with Finding Nemo, a record-breaking animated film. Paramount blamed the failure of the film on the poor performance of the then-latest installment of the video game series, Tomb Raider: The Angel of Darkness. After numerous delays, Angel of Darkness was rushed to shelves just over a month before the release of the film, despite the final product being unfinished and loaded with bugs. It spawned mediocre sales, and mixed reviews from critics. Former Eidos Interactive senior executive Jeremy Heath-Smith, who was also credited as an executive producer in the film, resigned days after the game was released.

Critical response
According to review aggregator Metacritic, Lara Croft: Tomb Raider – The Cradle of Life received "mixed or average reviews" based on an average score of 43/100 from 34 critic reviews. The website's critical consensus reads, "Though the sequel is an improvement over the first movie, it's still lacking in thrills." Audiences polled by Cinemascore gave it a grade of "B−" on a scale of A to F.

Salon described it as a "highly enjoyable summer thrill ride." Roger Ebert gave the film 3 out of 4 stars, stating that the film was "better than the first one, more assured, more entertaining ... it uses imagination and exciting locations to give the movie the same kind of pulp adventure feeling we get from the Indiana Jones movies." David Rooney of Variety praised Jolie for being "hotter, faster and more commanding than last time around as the fearless heiress/adventuress, plus a little more human."

The film was nonetheless panned by most critics. Rene Rodriguez of The Miami Herald called it "another joyless, brain-numbing adventure through lackluster Indiana Jones territory". James Berardinelli of ReelViews said "The first Tomb Raider was dumb fun; Cradle of Life is just plain dumb ... the worst action movie of the summer." Wesley Morris of The Boston Globe wrote, "It's a bullet-riddled National Geographic special [that] produces a series of dumb, dismal shootouts that are so woefully choreographed there's reason to believe Debbie Allen may be behind them." He then said of director De Bont, "He has yet to meet a contraption he couldn't use to damage your hearing." 
Jolie earned a Golden Raspberry Award nomination for Worst Actress for her performance in the film.

Reboot

In March 2004, producer Lloyd Levin said that The Cradle of Life had earned enough internationally for Paramount to bankroll a third film, but any hopes of it going into production were soon quelled by Jolie's announcement that she had no desire to play Lara Croft a third time: "I just don't feel like I need to do another one. I felt really happy with the last one. It was one we really wanted to do." In 2018, the film series was rebooted with Alicia Vikander as Lara Croft.

See also
 List of films based on video games

References

External links
 
 
 

 

2000s action adventure films
2000s American films
2000s British films
2000s Japanese films
2000s German films

2003 fantasy films 
2003 films
American action adventure films
American fantasy adventure films 
American sequel films
British action adventure films
British sequel films
Censored films
English-language German films
English-language Japanese films
Film censorship in China
Film controversies in China
Films based on classical mythology
Films directed by Jan de Bont
Films produced by Lawrence Gordon
Films scored by Alan Silvestri
Films set in Hong Kong
Films set in Kenya
Films set in Shanghai
Films set in the Mediterranean Sea
Films shot at Pinewood Studios
Films shot in Greece
Films shot in Wales
Films with screenplays by Steven E. de Souza
German action adventure films
German sequel films
Girls with guns films
Japanese action adventure films
Japanese sequel films
Live-action films based on video games
Mutual Film Company films
Paramount Pictures films
Tomb Raider films
Treasure hunt films
Underwater action films